Jesus Camp is a 2006 American documentary film directed by Rachel Grady and Heidi Ewing about a charismatic Christian summer camp, where children spend their summers being taught that they have "prophetic gifts" and can "take back America for Christ". According to the distributor, it "doesn't come with any prepackaged point of view" and attempts to be "an honest and impartial depiction of one faction of the evangelical Christian community".

Jesus Camp premiered at the 2006 Tribeca Film Festival, and was sold by A&E Indie Films to Magnolia Pictures. Nominated for Best Documentary Feature at the 79th Academy Awards, the film brought controversy to the camp which led to its eventual closure.

Overview
Jesus Camp is about the Kids on Fire School of Ministry, a charismatic Christian summer camp located just outside Devils Lake, North Dakota and run by Becky Fischer and her ministry, Kids in Ministry International. The film focuses on three of the children who attended the camp in the summer of 2005—Levi, Rachael, and Tory (Victoria). The film cuts between footage of the camp and a children's prayer conference held just before the camp at Christ Triumphant Church, a large charismatic church in Lee's Summit, Missouri, a suburb of Kansas City.

All three children are already very devout Christians. Levi has preached several sermons at his father's church, Rock of Ages Church in St. Robert, Missouri. He is homeschooled, his mother explaining that God did not give her a child just so he could be raised by someone else eight hours a day. He learns science from books and videos that attempt to reconcile young-earth creationism with scientific principles, and that climate change is mere political speculation. Levi preaches a sermon at the camp in which he declares that his generation is key to bringing Jesus back.  Rachael, who also attends Levi's church (her father was assistant pastor at the time), is seen praying over a bowling ball during a game early in the film, and evangelizes to strangers, telling them that Jesus loves them. She does not think highly of non-charismatic churches (or "dead churches" as she calls them), feeling they are not "churches that God likes to go to." Tory is a member of the Children's Praise Dance Team at Christ Triumphant Church. She is observed dancing to Christian rock music, and says she has to check herself to make sure she is not "dancing for the flesh."

At the camp, Fischer stresses the need for children to purify themselves in order to be part of the "army of God." She strongly believes that children need to be in the forefront of turning America toward conservative Christian values. She also feels that Christians need to focus on training kids since "the enemy" (radical Islam) is focused on training theirs. She compares the preparation she is giving children with the training of terrorists in the Middle East. "I want to see young people who are as committed to the cause of Jesus Christ as the young people are to the cause of Islam," she tells the camera. "I want to see them radically laying down their lives for the gospel, as they are over in Pakistan and Israel and Palestine."

In one scene shot at Christ Triumphant Church, a woman brings a life-sized cutout of George W. Bush to the front of the church and has the children stretch their hands toward him in prayer for him. This is derivative of the laying on of hands, a common practice in charismatic Christian circles. In one very famous scene, Fischer rails hard against Harry Potter, and infers that it is a gateway to joining the occult, in an attempt to scare the children into avoiding it. She infers that if Harry Potter was a real warlock, and lived during the old testament era, that the Jews would have stoned him to death. This aggressive attitude was a common position on the fantasy series, in the Evangelical community at the time. In another scene, Lou Engle preaches a message urging children to join the fight to end abortion in America. Children are shown a series of plastic models of developing fetuses, and have their mouths covered with red tape with "Life" written across it. Engle is a founder of the Justice House of Prayer and a leader of Harvest International Ministries, a network of charismatic-oriented ministries with which both the church and Fischer's ministry are affiliated. He prays for Bush to have the strength to appoint "righteous judges" who will overturn Roe v. Wade. By the end of the sermon, the children are chanting, "Righteous judges! Righteous judges!"

There is also a scene at New Life Church in Colorado Springs, Colorado where Ted Haggard preaches a sermon against homosexuality. Before the service, Levi mentioned how he admired Ted Haggard and was looking forward to meeting him. After the sermon, Levi informs Haggard that he has already preached sermons and wants to be a preacher when he grows up. Haggard advises him: "I say, use your cute kid thing until you're thirty, and by then you'll have good content." Afterward, Levi, Rachael, Tory, their families and several other children take part in a Justice House of Prayer rally held by Engle in front of the U.S. Supreme Court.

Throughout the movie, there are cut scenes to a debate between Fischer and Mike Papantonio, an attorney and a radio talk-show host for Air America Radio's Ring of Fire. Papantonio questions Fischer's motives for focusing her ministry efforts on children. Fischer explains that she does not believe that people are able to choose their belief system once they pass childhood, and that it is important that they be "indoctrinated" in evangelical Christian values from a young age. Fischer also explains that democracy is flawed and designed to destroy itself "because we have to give everyone equal freedom".

Release
Jesus Camp was screened at Michael Moore's Traverse City Film Festival against the wishes of the distribution company, Magnolia Pictures. Magnolia had pulled Jesus Camp from the festival earlier in the summer after it purchased rights to the film, in a decision apparently inspired by Moore's association with the film festival, with Magnolia president Eamonn Bowles saying "I don't want the perception out in the public that this is an agenda-laden film".

Home media
The DVD, released in January 2007, includes 15 deleted scenes. In one of them, Levi's father and mother suggest that a future president may well have been at Kids on Fire. In another, a woman takes several of the kids on a "prayer walk" through Lee's Summit, and later takes them to a crisis pregnancy center.  A Planned Parenthood clinic is located next door, and the woman has the kids pray over it. In an interview, the anti-abortion clinic's director says that she was very pleased to see children so passionate about ending abortion.

The DVD also includes commentary by Grady and Ewing. They reveal that when they arrived in Kansas City, there was a great deal of excitement over the nomination of Samuel Alito to the Supreme Court. However, according to Grady and Ewing, Fischer and the others did not see their activism for socially conservative causes as political, but as a matter of faith. They also reveal that Fischer and the others did not understand why some of the scenes of them speaking in tongues and praying over objects were included in the film, since such occurrences were second nature to them. Furthermore, on the DVD commentary, Heidi and Grady refer to the central character, Becky Fischer, as "a great documentary subject" because of her charisma.

Reception

Controversy
According to Ron Reno of Focus on the Family, 
The directors' claims that they were simply trying to create an 'objective' film about children and faith ring hollow. I don't question the motives of the Christians shown in the film. Indeed, the earnestness and zeal with which the young people pictured attempt to live out their faith are admirable. Unfortunately, however, it appears that they were unknowingly being manipulated by the directors in their effort to cast evangelical Christianity in an unflattering light.

In November 2006, Fischer announced that she would be shutting down the camp due to negative reaction towards her in the film. According to Fischer's website, the owners of the property used for the camp shown in the film were concerned about vandalism to the premises following the film's release and thus will not allow it to be used for any future camps. Fischer has said that the camp will be indefinitely postponed until other suitable premises can be found, but that it will be back.

Critical reception
Jesus Camp received an 87% "Certified Fresh" rating on Rotten Tomatoes, based on 105 reviews, with an average rating of 7.26/10. The website's consensus states, "Evangelical indoctrination is given an unflinching, even-handed look in this utterly worthwhile documentary." The documentary has a 62/100 score on Metacritic based on 28 mainstream reviews, indicating "generally favorable reviews".

Michael Smith of the Tulsa World gave the film three stars out of four, describing it as "impressive in its even-handed presentation", "straightforward" and "a revealing, unabashed look at the formation of tomorrow's army of God."

The Chicago Tribune reviewer Jessica Reaves also gave the film three stars out of four and writes that Jesus Camp is "an enlightening and frank look at what the force known as Evangelical America believes, preaches and teaches their children" and concludes that what the filmmakers "have accomplished here is remarkable—capturing the visceral humanity, desire and unflagging political will of a religious movement."

David Edelstein of CBS Sunday Morning, New York, and NPR finds Jesus Camp "a frightening, infuriating, yet profoundly compassionate documentary about the indoctrination of children by the Evangelical right."

Some reviewers responded negatively to the film; Rob Nelson of the Village Voice called the movie "[an] absurdly hypocritical critique of the far right's role in the escalating culture war", and J. R. Jones of the Chicago Reader criticized the film for "failing to distinguish the more fundamentalist Pentecostals" and for inserting "unnecessary editorializing" by using clips from Mike Papantonio's radio show.

Award nominations
Jesus Camp was nominated for Best Documentary Feature at the 79th Academy Awards; it lost to Davis Guggenheim and Al Gore's An Inconvenient Truth.

See also 

Marjoe
Religulous
The God Who Wasn't There
Friends of God: A Road Trip with Alexandra Pelosi
One of Us

References

Further reading 
   Foreword by Dr. Ted Baehr of MovieGuide and the Christian Film & Television Commission.

External links 

 Jesus Camp synopsis by Magnolia Pictures
 Kids in Ministry International (KIMI) – Sponsoring organization of the camp
 
 
 

2006 documentary films
2006 films
2006 in Christianity
American documentary films
Christian educational organizations
Christianity in North Dakota
Documentary films about children
Documentary films about Christianity in the United States
Films about evangelicalism
Documentary films critical of Christianity
Films critical of religion
Films set in Colorado
Films set in Missouri
Films set in North Dakota
Films set in Washington, D.C.
Films shot in North Dakota
Magnolia Pictures films
Works about religion and children
Films directed by Heidi Ewing and Rachel Grady
Films about summer camps
Documentary films about North Dakota
Documentary films about Missouri
Religious controversies in film
2000s English-language films
2000s American films